Tilanne (Finnish: Situation) was a monthly leftist magazine published in Helsinki, Finland, in the period between 1961 and 1967. It was one of the magazines funded by the CIA through the Congress for Cultural Freedom (CCF) during the cultural Cold War.

History and profile
Tilanne was started in Helsinki in 1961. The founders of the magazine were communist figures who left the Communist Party of Finland the same year. Its stated goal was to present a third way in the leftist ideology rejecting the dominant communist views. It billed itself as a socialist and humanist publication which attempted to explicitly define the way of Finland in achieving a socialist system theoretically and practically. The magazine also declared that it was a supporter of the independence of Finland. It came out monthly.

Although Tilanne announced that it would not accept any financial support if such a support would control its editorial approach, it was partially financed by the American national intelligence organization CIA, but it was not an official support. One of the editors-in-chief was the Finnish writer Jarno Pennanen. The magazine mostly featured materials and articles produced by the CCF figures. Tilanne folded in 1967.

References

External links

1961 establishments in Finland
1967 disestablishments in Finland
CIA activities in Russia and Europe
Congress for Cultural Freedom
Defunct political magazines published in Finland
Finnish-language magazines
Magazines established in 1961
Magazines disestablished in 1967
Magazines published in Helsinki
Monthly magazines published in Finland
Propaganda newspapers and magazines
Socialist magazines
Cold War propaganda